A capsule wardrobe is a small collection of clothes that can be put together in different ways and includes everything you would normally need to wear. The aim is to have an outfit suitable for any occasion without owning excessive items of clothing. This is usually achieved by buying what are considered to be "key" or "staple" items in coordinating colours. It has been the subject of several popular television series and appears widely in British and American fashion media.

Capsule wardrobes appeared in American publications as early as the 1940s as small collections of garments designed to be worn together which harmonize in color and line. Susie Faux, owner of London boutique "Wardrobe", revived the term in the 1970s. According to Faux, a capsule wardrobe is a collection of a few essential items of clothing that do not go out of fashion, such as skirts, trousers, and coats, which can then be augmented with seasonal pieces. American designer Donna Karan popularised the idea when in 1985, she released an influential capsule collection of seven interchangeable work-wear pieces.

History and popularity 
The use of "capsule" to mean "small and compact" was a distinctly American use of the word that surfaced in 1938 according to the Oxford English Dictionary. The term capsule wardrobe appeared in American publications as early as the 1940s to denote a small collection of garments designed to be worn together which harmonized in color and line. The term was revived by Susie Faux, owner of the West End boutique "Wardrobe", in the 1970s to refer to a collection of essential items of clothing that would not go out of fashion, and therefore could be worn for multiple seasons. The aim was to update this collection with seasonal pieces to provide something to wear for any occasion without buying many new items of clothing. Typically, Faux suggests that a woman's capsule wardrobe contain at least "2 pairs of trousers, a dress or a skirt, a jacket, a coat, a knit, two pairs of shoes and two bags".

The concept of a capsule wardrobe was popularised by American designer Donna Karan in 1985, when she released her "7 Easy Pieces" collection. Her aim was to fill what she referred to as "a void in the marketplace" for a stylish and practical wardrobe designed with working women in mind. When the collection debuted, she showed eight models dressed only in bodysuits and black tights. The models then began to add items of clothing such as wrap-skirts, trousers, and dresses, to demonstrate her interchangeable style of dressing.

As a term, "capsule wardrobe" is widely used in the fashion media; the fashion sections in British newspapers The Independent and The Daily Telegraph have run feature articles on capsule wardrobes, as have British Marie Claire and Elle magazines, among others. The concept has been further popularised by several television programmes, including Trinny and Susannah's 'What Not to Wear''', which aired on the BBC 2001–2007, and Gok's Fashion Fix'', which aired on Channel Four from 2008 onwards. Presenter and stylist Gok Wan asserts that a capsule wardrobe is an especially important tool in a recession as it allows people to look good on a small budget.

General rules 
Below are rules widely given for creating a capsule wardrobe:

 Choose a colour scheme. This would typically involve choosing one or two base colours that go with everything, such as black, white, brown, grey, or navy. Items such as trousers, handbags or coats would be bought in shades of these colours, so that they can be put with anything else in the wardrobe. After choosing the base colours, choose one or two accent colours, which are brighter than the base colours, and co-ordinate with each other. These would typically be used for items such as tops, dresses, or accessories; once a colour scheme is established, all the items in a wardrobe should be interchangeable, as the colour of the pieces always complement each other.
 Consider your body shape.  Some cuts of clothing are more flattering than others; for instance, stylists often advise that women with wider hips wear cap sleeves, as they make the shoulders appear wider, and more proportionate to the hips. If the items of clothing chosen are flattering, the wearer is more likely to want to keep them in their wardrobe.
 Consider your complexion. As with cuts of clothing, some colours are more flattering than others, to both skin tone and body shape. If the colours are well-chosen, then the items are more likely to remain in favour.
 Choose classic shapes and patterns.  While some cuts and patterns of clothing go in and out of fashion, others are considered 'classic' because they do not date. It is wise to choose classic pieces for a capsule wardrobe, as the wearer intends to keep them for a number of years.
 Choose high-quality fabrics.  As the idea of a capsule wardrobe is to own a few items of clothing that can be worn different ways, individual pieces get much wear. Therefore, it is a good idea to choose clothing that is well made and continues to look good despite wear.

Examples 
Below are examples of a typical capsule wardrobe, one for women and one for men.

See also
 Simple living

References

Fashion
Simple living